Ivo Viktor (born 21 May 1942 in Křelov) is a Czech former football goalkeeper. He played for Czechoslovakia, representing his country on 63 occasions between 1966 and 1977, taking part in the 1970 FIFA World Cup and winning the 1976 European Championship. Regarded as one of the best goalkeepers of his generation in Europe in his prime, he placed third in the 1976 Ballon d'Or, and was a five-time winner of the Czechoslovak Footballer of the Year award, and a two-time winner of the European Goalkeeper of the Year award.

Club career
In his country, Viktor played for several clubs, including Dukla Prague, where he remained for 13 years, winning several titles.

International career

Viktor's senior national team debut came in 1966 against Brazil at the Maracanã stadium. He represented his nation at the 1970 FIFA World Cup. He was one of the brightest stars at UEFA Euro 1976, where he helped Czechoslovakia win the championship, producing notable performances and key saves against the Netherlands in the semi-final, and West Germany in the final, later being named to the team of the tournament. In the same year he came third in the European Footballer of the Year awards. In total, he made 63 international appearances between 1966 and 1977.

Coaching career
Viktor took charge of Dukla Prague for one season as manager, in the 1990–91 Czechoslovak First League. The club finished the season in 11th place.

Honours

Club
Dukla Prague
 Czechoslovak First League:  1964, 1966, 1977
 Czechoslovak Cup: 1965, 1966, 1969

International
Czechoslovakia
 UEFA European Football Championship: 1976

Individual
 Czechoslovak Footballer of the Year: 1968, 1972, 1973, 1975, 1976
 Ballon d'Or: Third place 1976
 European Goalkeeper of the Year award: 1969, 1976
 UEFA Euro Team of the Tournament: 1976
 Voted 24th in Keeper of the Century – IFFHS' Century Elections.

References

External links
 
 Profile
 1976 Euro Cup win
 European Keeper of the Century

1942 births
Living people
Czech footballers
Czechoslovak footballers
Association football goalkeepers
1970 FIFA World Cup players
UEFA Euro 1976 players
UEFA European Championship-winning players
Czechoslovakia international footballers
FC Zbrojovka Brno players
Dukla Prague footballers
Czech football managers
Czechoslovak football managers
Dukla Prague managers
People from Olomouc District
Sportspeople from the Olomouc Region